Piwei River is a river in the east-central part of the Canadian province of Saskatchewan in the boreal forest ecozone of Canada. It begins at the western end of the Porcupine Hills at Piwei Lakes and heads in an easterly direction through a glacier-formed valley and into the Etomami River, which is a tributary of the Red Deer River.

The river is accessed from Highways 984 and 983. Save for a small recreation park on the river's north bank, there are no communities nor settlements along its course. Big Valley Lake Ecological Reserve, one of Saskatchewan's Representative Area Ecological Reserves, is in Piwei River's watershed upstream along Big Valley Creek's course on the shore of Big Valley Lake.

Course 
From the lakes, it heads east through the Porcupine Provincial Forest and glacier-formed valleys en route to its terminus at the Etomami River. The valley that the river follows continues east past Etomami River and is a natural portage to the Pepaw River, which follows that same valley farther east.

Tributaries
Mud Creek (into Piwei Lakes)
Big Valley Creek
Wells Creek
Lawson Creek
Ravina Creek
Cameron Creek
Gara Creek

Piwei River Recreation Site 
Piwei River Recreation Site is a recreation site located on the north bank of Piwei River, just downstream from Piwei Lakes. The park facilities include an access to snowmobile trails, a warm up shelter, and access to the river. Accessed to the park is from Highway 984.

See also 
List of rivers of Saskatchewan
Tourism in Saskatchewan
Hudson Bay drainage basin

References 

Rivers of Saskatchewan
Porcupine No. 395, Saskatchewan
Hudson Bay No. 394, Saskatchewan